Pedro Gómez de Don Benito (1492-1567) was a Spanish noblemen, conquistador of  Guatemala, Mexico, Peru and Chile. Regidor and Alcalde of Santiago.

Biography 
Pedro Gómez de Don Benito arrived in Chile, in the expedition of Diego de Almagro. Gómez occupied the most important hierarchical positions as Maestre de Campo, General, Alferez real (1560), Encomendero and founder of La Serena and Santiago.

Family 

Born in Badajoz, was the son of Juan Gómez and Marina Sánchez. His wife was Isabel Pardo Parraguéz daughter of Bartolomé Pardo Parraguez (conquistador, born in Galicia) and María de Torres Zapata. Gómez and wife had numerous sons Juan Gómez, Pedro Gómez, Francisca Gómez Pajuelo, Elena Gómez Pardo, María Gómez Pardo, Leonor Gómez Pardo and Benita Gómez Pardo. Pedro Gómez had a natural son with a native, named Juan Gómez de Benito (captain, born in Peru).

References

External links 
alcaldesvcentenario.org

1492 births
1567 deaths
Spanish colonial governors and administrators
Spanish conquistadors
Explorers of South America
Spanish generals